Sweetwater Independent School District is a public school district based in Sweetwater, Texas, USA. Located in Nolan County, the district extends into a portion of Fisher County.

The Sweetwater Independent School District serves approximately 2,253 students in grades pre-kindergarten through 12 on six campuses: high school, middle school, intermediate school, two elementary schools, and an early childhood center. Sweetwater ISD is also the fiscal agent for a nine-member school special education shared service arrangement.

Schools
 Sweetwater High School [SHS] (Grades 9-12)
 Sweetwater Middle School [SMS] (Grades 6-8)
 Sweetwater Intermediate School (Grades 4-5)
 East Ridge Elementary School (Grades 2-3)
 Southeast Elementary School (Grades K-1)
 J.P. Cowen Elementary School (Pre-Kindergarten and Head Start/Early Head Start)

Sports
Newman Field, ballpark

References

School districts in Nolan County, Texas
School districts in Fisher County, Texas